Anne Aallonen (born 15 July 1967) is a Finnish-born Hong Kong former professional tennis player.

On 23 October 1989, she reached her highest WTA singles ranking of 179. On 20 August 1990, she also reached her highest WTA doubles ranking of 116.

Anne Aallonen debuted for the Finland Fed Cup team in 1985, winning her singles match in the tie against the Chinese Taipei Fed Cup team. In 1999 she competed for the Hong Kong Fed Cup team.

ITF finals

Singles (0–1)

Doubles Finals: 17 (9-8)

References

External links
 
 

1967 births
Living people
Finnish female tennis players
Hong Kong people of Finnish descent
Hong Kong female tennis players
Finnish emigrants to Hong Kong
Sportspeople from Lahti